Kenneth Henry Albert Fish (20 February 1914 – 4 August 2005) was a South African footballer who played for English club Port Vale and Swiss side Young Boys. He later served behind the scenes at Port Vale, Birmingham City, and Oxford United.

Playing career
Fish played for Railway Association (in South Africa) before moving to England to play for Aston Villa in January 1937. He signed with Port Vale of the Third Division North for a sizeable fee in November 1937. He scored his first goal in a 3–1 defeat to Carlisle United at Brunton Park on 20 November. He played just six games (five in the Football League and one FA Cup) and was sold to Swiss side Young Boys in October 1938. He returned to Vale as the assistant trainer in July 1939 and re-signed as a player the following month.

World War II and post-war coaching career
World War II disrupted football in 1939 and as a result Fish enlisted in the Army in September 1939. He served as a warrant officer and a remedial specialist. He guested for Stafford Rangers during the war and after its conclusion was appointed as Port Vale's trainer in July 1946. He was temporarily in control of team affairs in November and December 1951 after Ivor Powell's unsuccessful tenure, winning one game.

In March 1958 he moved on to Birmingham City as trainer-coach, a position he later held at Oxford United. Fish worked at Oxford United for more than twenty years. At the end of the 1986 League Cup Final at Wembley, in which Oxford beat QPR 3–0, the manager, Maurice Evans, insisted that Fish go up to the royal box to receive the medal that would usually have gone to the manager.

Career statistics
Source:

References

1914 births
2005 deaths
Sportspeople from Cape Town
South African soccer players
Association football forwards
White South African people
South Africa international soccer players
Expatriate footballers in England
Aston Villa F.C. players
Port Vale F.C. players
Stafford Rangers F.C. wartime guest players
Expatriate footballers in Switzerland
BSC Young Boys players
English Football League players
British Army personnel of World War II
Association football coaches
Port Vale F.C. non-playing staff
Birmingham City F.C. non-playing staff
Oxford United F.C. non-playing staff
South African soccer managers
Expatriate football managers in England
Port Vale F.C. managers
English Football League managers